Amana is a genus of moths in the family Epicopeiidae.

Species
Amana angulifera Walker, 1855

Former species
Amana banghaasi Hering, 1932

References

Epicopeiidae